Chryseobacterium jeonii  is a bacterium from the genus of Chryseobacterium which has been isolated from moss from the Antarctica.

References

Further reading

External links
Type strain of Chryseobacterium jeonii at BacDive -  the Bacterial Diversity Metadatabase

jeonii
Bacteria described in 2009